Gustavo Nestor Rowek (born 19 March 1963) is an Argentine heavy metal drummer known for being one of the founders of heavy metal movement in Argentina through its participation in Surmenage, WC, V8 and Rata Blanca. Currently he works in his own project Rowek.

Career

Early years, V8 and Rata Blanca 
Rowek began playing at age 16, after a friend taught him some basic principles. His first band was called Sourmenage, but later he left this to join WC. The band performed in various places, including a festival by the heavy metal band V8, a group with which they became friends. Gustavo finished part of the formation of V8.

Rowek split with V8 in 1985 and in Brazil began with Osvaldo Civile to shape what would become Horcas. On his return from Brazil, Rowek agreed to help Walter Giardino recording a demo of some songs. That would be temporary, however with the result obtained in the demo, and seeing that the project Horcas was delayed, together they founded the band Rata Blanca. Transcending even the boundaries of their country and sell their music making in over 14 countries. Rata Blanca won several gold records, platinum, double and even triple platinum sales, with this band toured throughout America and Europe. Rata Blanca dissolved in late 1997.

Nativo, Ian and V8 tribute 
Rowek stood by Sergio Berdichevsky and formed the band Nativo. With this independent band, materialized numerous accomplishments and share the stage with bands like Attaque 77, Linkin Park and Red Hot Chili Peppers, among others.
Nativo released four albums, but Rowek decided to end the band to devote himself to his personal project. Parallel to Nativo, in 2006 were invited by singer Mario Ian, who had shared the stage in Rata Blanca composing together several tracks on the album "Entre el Cielo y el Infierno", to join his band as guest musicians, but before the success and impact obtained decide to form a project band with Ian.
In 2011, Gustavo Rowek decided to put together a tribute to V8 with renowned musicians in the Argentine metal importance to this summons Walter Meza, Topo Yañez (Horcas) and Antonio Romano (former Hermética) tribute with which is rotating around the country and even outside it. In 2012, Gustavo Rowek leaves Ian due to focus his career in a new soloist project.

Rowek 
In 2011, he began with his solo band Rowek.

Discography

References 

1963 births
Living people
Argentine people of Polish descent
Argentine heavy metal drummers
Male drummers
Christian metal musicians
Rata Blanca members